= W. Park =

Australian soccer coach

Personal information
- Full name: W. Park

Managerial career
- Years: Team
- 1949: Australia

W. Park (fl. 1949) was a soccer coach of the 1940s.

In 1949, he was trainer of the Australian national team for four games, all against Hajduk Split who were billed at the time as "Yugoslavia". The matches ended in one win and three losses for Australia.
